Timothy Bach (born 28 February 1953) is a Canadian former swimmer. He competed in the men's 4 × 100 metre freestyle relay at the 1972 Summer Olympics.

References

External links
 

1953 births
Living people
Canadian male swimmers
Olympic swimmers of Canada
Swimmers at the 1972 Summer Olympics
Swimmers from Vancouver
Pan American Games medalists in swimming
Pan American Games silver medalists for Canada
Swimmers at the 1971 Pan American Games
Canadian male freestyle swimmers
Medalists at the 1971 Pan American Games